Mander Organs Limited formerly N.P Mander Limited was an English pipe organ maker and refurbisher based in London. Although well known for many years in the organ building industry, they achieved wider notability in 2004 with the refurbishment of the Royal Albert Hall's Father Willis Grand Organ. The company filed for insolvency in 2020.

Mander built and installed numerous celebrated organs, notably the 68-stop four manual and pedal organ in the Church of St Ignatius Loyola, New York – reportedly the largest mechanical action built by a British builder. Simon Preston said of this instrument: "It is difficult to do justice to this famous instrument in a couple of sentences; suffice to say that to look at this beautiful instrument is to know the sound that will come out of it."

New Mander organs were generally tracker action, which enables the player to give somewhat more expression and removes the delays which are inherent in many electrically actuated organs.

The company was founded in 1936 by Noel Mander. An early setback was the loss of the organ he was working on, along with all his tools, in the first air raid of the Blitz in 1940. The rebuilding of church organs after World War II provided significant business for the company.

Following the retirement of Noel Mander in 1983, the firm was run by John Pike Mander, Noel Mander's son.  On John Pike Mander's retirement at the end of 2018 the company's shareholding was transferred to an Employee Ownership Trust, giving all members of staff a stake in the future of the business. The company unexpectedly closed in July 2020 following financial difficulties exacerbated by the COVID-19 pandemic.

The Mander trading name was bought by F.H Browne & Sons - a small regional organ-building firm based near Canterbury. That firm trades as Mander Organ Builders. The remains of the original firm including its equipment, tuning round and contracts were broken up and sold separately to a range of bidders.

Instruments by the original Mander Organs Ltd are found throughout the world, including in Australia, New Zealand, Japan, the Middle East, Scandinavia and the United States.

Some Mander organs 

Church of St. Ignatius Loyola (New York City)
Royal Albert Hall, London, England
St. Paul's Cathedral, London, England
Chelmsford Cathedral, England.  Two organs provided by Mander: a larger one at the back of the Nave and a smaller one in the South Quire aisle near the choir-stalls.
Rochester Cathedral, England.  Major re-modelling by Mander in 1989
Chichester Cathedral, England.  Major re-modelling of the 1851 Hill organ by Mander in 1984-86
St John's College Chapel, Cambridge
Pembroke College Chapel, Cambridge - new organ by Mander in 1980 using some historic pipework and case facades.
National Churchill Museum, Westminster College, Fulton, Missouri, USA - Church of St. Mary the Virgin, Aldermanbury, the church transplanted to Missouri from London, England.
 St Peter's Episcopal Church, St Louis, Missouri, USA
Urakami Cathedral, Nagasaki, Japan
St. Andrew's University, Osaka, Japan
Sydney Grammar School, Australia
St Giles-without-Cripplegate, London, England. Two organs provided by Mander: a larger one at the back of the Nave, transplanted here by Mander in 1971 from St Luke Old Street, London, England and substantially re-modelled in the process, and a smaller, entirely new one dating from 2008 in the North Nave aisle.
St Paul's, Bow Common, London, England
St Peter's Church, St Albans, Hertfordshire, England
Abbey Church of Waltham Holy Cross and St Lawrence, Waltham Abbey, England. 2019 rebuild of organ.

References

Mander, Organs
Organ builders of the United Kingdom
Manufacturing companies established in 1936
1936 establishments in England
British companies established in 1936
Musical instrument manufacturing companies of the United Kingdom